Ballyfermot De La Salle GAA is a Gaelic Athletic Association club in based in the Ballyfermot area of Dublin.

The club was founded in 1953 and was known as Ballyfermot Gaels at that time.

The club has adult football and underage teams at various levels.

The club plays in the Kerry colours as a tribute to the first parish priest, Kerryman Charles Canon Troy who sponsored the club.

Club Honours
 Dublin Under 21 Hurling Championship Winners 1964
 Duffy Cup Winners 2017
 Dublin Junior E Football Championship Champions 2017
 Dublin AFL Division 10 Champions 2017
 Dublin AFL Division 9 Champions 2018
 Dublin AFL Division 8 Champions 2019
 Dublin Junior 2 Club Football Championship Champions 2021

External links

Gaelic games clubs in South Dublin (county)
Gaelic football clubs in South Dublin (county)
1953 establishments in Ireland